Sugiarto (born July 17, 1988) is an Indonesian footballer who currently plays for Deltras FC in the Indonesia Super League.

References

External links

1987 births
Association football forwards
Living people
Indonesian footballers
Liga 1 (Indonesia) players
Deltras F.C. players
Indonesian Premier Division players
People from Sidoarjo Regency
Sportspeople from East Java